Paul William Millar (born 16 November 1966) is a Northern Irish former football player and coach.

As a player, he played in midfield and attack. He started at Glentoran, moving on to Portadown, before signing with Port Vale in 1988. Three years later he transferred to Cardiff City, and helped the Welsh club to top the Third Division in 1992–93. In 1995, he left the Football League to return to Ireland, signing with Linfield and later returned to Wales to play for Bangor. He won youth caps for his country, and also earned a Northern Ireland B cap.

As a manager, he was appointed manager of Bangor, before moving on to Ballymena United. In 2005, he was made manager of Newry City, moving on to Glentoran the next season, and then returning to the management position at Bangor in 2007. In 2008, he was appointed manager at Larne, before he left the club in April 2012.

Playing career
Millar started his career with Glentoran, after scoring 15 goals in 28 appearances, he moved to Portadown. The young forward was selected as the Irish Young Footballer of the Year in 1986, and scored the winning goal in the final of the Irish Cup. He joined Port Vale in the English Third Division for £20,000 in December 1988. After playing just one reserve team game he seriously damaged his knee ligaments in training and after recovering finally made his debut at Vale Park in a 1–1 draw with Middlesbrough on 30 October 1989, coming on as a substitute. With Vale now competing in the Second Division he struggled to gain a place in the first team and was loaned to Fourth Division side Hereford United in October 1990, returning to Vale the next month after two goals in five games at Edgar Street. Overall, he made 44 appearances for John Rudge's "Valiants", though most of these were as a substitute. He was sold to Cardiff City for £60,000 in August 1991.

He made over 100 appearances in four years under "Bluebirds" manager Eddie May. Cardiff missed out on the play-offs by three points in 1991–92, before winning promotion to the Second Division as Third Division champions in 1992–93. Avoiding relegation by two points in 1993–94, Cardiff were relegated in 1994–95 after finishing twelve points short of safety. At this point Millar returned to Northern Ireland, signing with Linfield and then Portadown. He later became a player-manager, increasingly focussing on the management side of the game.

Management career
Millar had player-manager roles at Bangor, Ballymena and Brantwood, where he gained his European A Coaching Licence. He took up a full-time managerial position at IFA Premiership side Newry City in November 2005, getting the club into the top six in his first season.

Following the resignation of Roy Coyle, he was appointed as the manager of Glentoran in February 2006. Manager of the month in March 2006, he picked up the award for a second successive month after "Glens" secured second place in the league. The 2006–07 season started with Millar's side clear at the top, but a slump in the second half of the season saw them runners-up in the league for the second successive season. He was sacked in May 2007 after just 16 months in the job, he claimed he could "leave with his head held high" after securing a UEFA Cup spot. A week later he returned to Bangor, but quit that post in May 2008 after claiming an eight-match suspension handed to him by the Irish Football Association hindered his ability to manage the club.

He was appointed as manager of IFA Championship side Larne in December 2008. He led the Inver Park club to eighth and ninth-place finishes in 2008–09, 2009–10 and 2010–11. On 16 January 2010, fighting broke about between Larne and Newry City players and coaching staff, and Millar was sent off. An IFA Commission was set up to investigate the brawl, and Millar was handed a four-game ban, whilst the club were fined £1,200 and Larne player Anthony Lagan was suspended for the rest of the season. Newry chairman Paul McKenna condemned the lenient punishments, stating that the commission "bottled it", though the IFA ruled that they "acted fully in line with regulations and procedures". The fixture was abandoned and Newry were awarded a 2–1 victory. Larne finished tenth in 2011–12, and Millar resigned in April 2012 to take up the position as Gary Hamilton's assistant at Glenavon. After seven years at the club, Millar departed Glenavon on 2 April 2019 and returned to Glentoran as new manager Mick McDermott's assistant. McDermott praised Millar when he picked up the Manager of the Month award for December 2021. McDermott was relived of his duties in January 2023.

Personal life
His son, Philip, died from a drugs overdose in 2017.

Career statistics
Source:

Honours

as a Player
Individual
Irish Young Footballer of the Year: 1986

Glentoran
Irish Cup: 1986

Cardiff City
Football League Third Division: 1992–93

as a Manager
Individual
Northern Ireland Football Writers' Manager of the Month: March 2006, April 2006

References

Living people
1966 births
Association footballers from Belfast
Association football midfielders
Association football forwards
Association footballers from Northern Ireland
Northern Ireland under-21 international footballers
Northern Ireland youth international footballers
Northern Ireland B international footballers
Glentoran F.C. players
Portadown F.C. players
Port Vale F.C. players
Hereford United F.C. players
Cardiff City F.C. players
Linfield F.C. players
Bangor F.C. players
Ards F.C. players
Ballymena United F.C. players
Brantwood F.C. players
NIFL Premiership players
English Football League players
Association football coaches
Association football player-managers
Football managers from Northern Ireland
Bangor F.C. managers
Ballymena United F.C. managers
Newry Town F.C. managers
Glentoran F.C. managers
Larne F.C. managers